Reebonz is an online platform for buying and selling luxury products. Members can shop on web or mobile for new and used luxury merchandise. Visitors are required to log in via Facebook Connect, or register as a member with their email addresses before they can view and buy. Membership is free.

Reebonz targets customers in the Asia-Pacific region, and is one of the most established online luxury sales companies in Southeast Asia consisting of over 300 staff, with business operations in eight countries in Singapore, Malaysia, Indonesia, Taiwan, Hong Kong, Thailand, Australia and South Korea.

History 

Samuel Lim, Daniel Lim, and Benjamin Han co-founded Reebonz in March 2009, starting the company with 18 employees. Prior to Reebonz, Samuel Lim founded one of South East Asia’s largest mobile content business, Fusion Mobile, in his first year of university in 2000. In 2004, he founded another line of business under eFusion Solutions Pte Ltd called Fusion Direct. Benjamin Han and Daniel Lim had their first taste of e-commerce when Zuunbo.com was launched in 2007. Zunnbo.com was awarded seed funding by the Singapore Management University (SMU) Business Innovation Generator, which manages the Entrepreneurial Talent Development Fund together with SPRING Singapore for investing in promising business proposals.

Co-founder Samuel Lim took out notices in BT on 10 September to alert creditors that Reebonz is "in creditors' voluntary liquidation". Lim explained in the notice that Reebonz "cannot by reason of its liabilities continue its business".

Products and services

Marketplace

In May 2015, Marketplace was launched as a global portal for merchants from around the world to list rare luxury fashion items for Reebonz members.

Sell and Consign

In April 2014, Reebonz.com merged with Reebonz Vintage to sell used designer items. The Sell and Consign service is available in Australia.

Closets

Launched in January 2015, Closets is the mobile selling platform in the Reebonz app that sells used designer items from leather goods, small leather goods, apparels to jewellery and watches. With a live chat function, buyers and sellers are able to enquire about the listed item, request for more images or negotiate on the final selling price. Closets is available in Singapore, Malaysia, Hong Kong, Taiwan and Thailand.

White Glove

White Glove is a concierge service where Reebonz helps members sell their pre-owned designer items. Reebonz picks up members' items for free and provides copywriting services before listing the item for sale. White Glove is available in Australia, Hong Kong, Taiwan and Myanmar.

Reebonz Atelier

Provides services from authentication and valuation to restoring and repairing. Gemologists  and Watch Connoisseurs

Mobile applications

Reebonz launched its mobile application for iPhone and iPad in 2010, and later for Android in July 2012.

Reebonz SPACE

In September 2011, Reebonz launched its "retail lounge", Reebonz SPACE.

Reebonz SPACE is currently located in the following four countries: Singapore, Malaysia, Thailand, Australia and Myanmar.

Reebonz Mobil

In May 2011, Reebonz launched Reebonz Mobil, a 40-foot-long mobile truck version of its online flash sales concept. A "luxury boutique on wheels", the truck could hold 150 items, and a maximum of 20 shoppers and staff members on board the truck at a time. The Reebonz Mobil was thought to be the first shopping platform of its kind in the shopping industry.

Awards and recognition

2012

NTV7 MY’s The Breakfast Show featured Reebonz.

Cosmopolitan SG awarded the 2012 Cosmo Webby Award for Best Site for Luxury Handbags to Reebonz.

2013

In early 2013, Singapore's media giant, MediaCorp, signed on as lead investor in a round of fund-raising by Reebonz. The round raised a total of S$50 million from MediaCorp and existing shareholders. This brings Reebonz's market valuation to likely cross the $250M mark. This is the first time MediaCorp has invested in an online retail firm - a time when e-commerce is flourishing.

2014

Reebonz was featured in Luxe Asia  of Channel NewsAsia

References

Singaporean companies established in 2009
Retail companies established in 2009
Internet properties established in 2009
2009 establishments in Singapore